The McGill Martlets represented McGill University in the 2008-09 Canadian Interuniversity Sport women's hockey season. The Martlets posted an unblemished 33-0 record against CIS opponents to go undefeated for the second straight season en route to capturing another CIS banner. Catherine Ward, Chantal Gauvin and goaltender Kalie Townsend were the only graduating players from the Martlets.

Exhibition

Alberta Panda Presence Pre-season Tournament
(3 games @ Edmonton)

NCAA Exhibition

Regular season

Roster

Schedule
The Martlets participated in the Theresa Humes Tournament at Concordia University from January 2–4.

Player stats
Rebecca Martindale, a 21-year-old education senior, posted a career-best 18 goals, 16 assists (34 points) in 42 games. Martindale doubled her points output from the previous season (42 games, 8 goals, 12 assists, 20 points). Chantal Gauvin, scored once and added 13 assists. She finished her McGill career with 7 goals, 29 assists and 36 points in 143 career contests.

Postseason

QSSF Tournament
Semifinals

Finals (for Ed Enos Trophy)

CIS Tournament

Awards and honors
Ann-Sophie Bettez, Athlete of the Week: Jan 6, 08 
Ann-Sophie Bettez, Athlete of the Week: Mar 2, 08 
Ann-Sophie Bettez, Athlete of the Week: Oct 19, 08 
Ann-Sophie Bettez, Athlete of the Week: Nov 9, 08 
Ann-Sophie Bettez, Athlete of the Week: Nov 16, 08 
Ann-Sophie Bettez, Athlete of the Week: Jan 11, 09
Cathy Chartrand, Athlete of the Week: Dec 29, 08 – Jan 04, 09
Vanessa Davidson, Athlete of the Week: Mar 02, 09 – Mar 08, 09
Marie-Andree Leclerc-Auger, Athlete of the Week: Feb 16, 09 – Feb 22, 09
Marie-Andree Leclerc-Auger, CIS Rookie of the Year
Leclerc-Auger became the third member of the Martlets in three years to be named as the top rookie in CIS women's hockey. This marked the first time in CIS history that players from the same school in a team sport were honoured as the nation's best freshman for three consecutive years. Catherine Ward and Ann-Sophie Bettez received the award in 2006-07 and 2007-08.
 Charline Labonté, nominee BLG Award (honouring the top CIS female and male athletes for the 2008-09 season) 
Jordana Perroff, Athlete of the Week: Feb 09, 09 – Feb 15, 09
Catherine Ward, Athlete of the Week: Sep 29, 08 – Oct 05, 08

Team awards
 Goaltender Charline Labonté and forward Ann-Sophie Bettez of Sept-Iles, Que., shared the honor as co-MVPs of the McGill women's hockey team
Chantal Gauvin, Most dedicated player honours.
Marie-Andrée Leclerc-Auger, earned Martlets rookie-of-the-year honours 
Marie-Andrée Leclerc-Auger, Martlets top sniper.
Rebecca Martindale, Most improved player 
Catherine Ward, Most outstanding defenceman award.
Catherine Ward won silver with Canada Under 22 team at the 2009 MLP Nations Cup in Germany

All-Canadian honors
Goaltender - Charline Labonté, First Team
Defence - Catherine Ward, First Team 
Forward - Ann-Sophie Bettez, First Team
Defence - Cathy Chartrand, Second Team
Forward - Vanessa Davidson, Second Team
Forward - Marie-Andrée Leclerc-Auger, All-Rookie Team

References

External links
 McGill women’s hockey
 The official site of   McGill athletics & recreation
 The official site of CIS Women's Hockey Championship

See also 
 McGill Martlets ice hockey
 2011–12 McGill Martlets women's ice hockey season
 2010–11 McGill Martlets women's hockey season
 2009–10 McGill Martlets women's hockey season

McGill
McGill Martlets women's ice hockey
Mc